Käre bröder, så låtom oss supa i frid (Dear brethren, so let us drink in peace) is Epistle No. 5 in the Swedish poet and performer Carl Michael Bellman's 1790 song collection, Fredman's Epistles. 
The epistle is subtitled "Til the trogne Bröder på Terra Nova i Gaffelgränden." ("To the faithful Brethren in Terra Nova in Gaffelgränden"). The first epistle to be written, it introduces Jean Fredman's fictional world of ragged drunken men in Stockholm's taverns, making music, drinking, and preaching the message of the apostles of brandy, in the style of St Paul's epistles. The composition's approach is simple compared to later epistles, retaining much of the character of a drinking song.

Scholars note that Bellman had the idea of parodying a sermon for the burial of the real Fredman in 1767, but transformed this into having Fredman as a prophet who sent Bacchanalian epistles to the faithful. This enabled Bellman to write a succession of epistles, 25 of them in 1770.

Background

Song

Music and verse form 

The song was composed in the spring of 1770; it was the first of the epistles to be written. There are three stanzas, each of 14 lines. The rhyming scheme is AA-BBCC-ADD-EEFFD.

Lyrics 

The subtitle text is "Til the trogne Bröder på Terra Nova i Gaffelgränden." ("To the faithful Brethren in Terra Nova in Gaffelgränden."), echoing the biblical language of St Paul's Epistles. The locale was a tavern in an alleyway of Stockholm's Gamla stan.

Reception and legacy 

The Bellman scholar Lars Lönnroth writes that soon after the real watchmaker Fredman's death in 1767, Bellman had the idea of a ceremony for his burial, complete with a poem that parodied a sermon: "We could call his soul a clockwork, his body a tavern." The idea of a sermon about Fredman was transformed into having him as a preaching prophet who sent epistles to the faithful. That in turn led to a whole series of Fredman's Epistles, the first being what is now called No. 5. Where St Paul had written to the Christian brothers in Ephesus or Corinth, the Bacchanalian St Fredman wrote to the Ale-ephesians and the Cheer-inthians, exhorting them to press grapes for wine. The language is intentionally old-style biblical in tone. In the second verse, Fredman announces that "Brännvins apostlar uppstiga var dag" ("Brandy's apostles rise up each day"), and invites his disciples to "Stöta basuner, förkunna vår lag" ("blow bassoons, proclaim our law"). Finally in the third verse, in the style of Acts of the Apostles, Fredman encourages his correspondent Theophilus to drink, mentioning Damascus, where St Paul had his dramatic conversion: "Drick min Theophile, strupen är djup; Si i Damasco där ligger en Slup, Fuller med flaskor" ("Drink my Theophilus", your throat is deep; See in Damascus there lies a sloop, full of bottles). Lönnroth comments that the lack of a harbour in Damascus would scarcely have troubled Bellman or his audience.

Carina Burman writes in her biography of Bellman that when he wrote this first epistle he certainly did not know he would eventually write another eighty of them: the genre was wholly new and fresh. In a rush of creativity, he wrote nine epistles between March and May 1770, and by the year's end he had written twenty-five. It was not, Burman explains, the first time he joked about religious texts, nor the first in which he mixed spirits and religion, but marked the start of his parodying of St Paul's letters to the faithful. She notes that the diction of Fredman's speech was already antique, echoing the tone of the Charles XII Bible, a translation completed in 1703. For example, Fredman says "världenes ondsko" where more modern Swedish would use "världens ondska" for "the evil of the world". All the same, this first parody of an epistle, described by some scholars as primitive, was still very close to Bellman's usual drinking-songs; later epistles such as No. 9, Käraste Bröder, Systrar och Vänner, became more complex, and biblical parody moved into the background. 

The Bellman Society calls the epistle a Bacchanalian mass in which Fredman the preacher encourages his congregation to drunkenness. The Epistle has been recorded by the actor Mikael Samuelson on his album Sjunger Fredmans Epistlar.

References

Sources

 
 
 
  
  (with facsimiles of sheet music from first editions in 1790, 1791)

External links 

 Text of Epistle 5 at Bellman.net

1770 compositions 
Swedish songs
Fredmans epistlar